South Frydek is a city in Austin County, Texas, United States. Initially incorporated as Gloster in May 2019, the name was changed to South Frydek seven months later. The city had a population of 207 at the 2020 census.

Prior to incorporation, South Frydek was part of the unincorporated community of Frydek in southeast Austin County. As portions of the Frydek community were added to the extraterritorial jurisdiction (ETJ) of nearby Sealy, it fueled an incorporation effort meant to preserve the rural character of the area. On November 4, 2018, approximately 50 residents attended a meeting at the Gloster Aerodrome and over 45 signatures were collected on a petition to incorporate a portion of Frydek as the city of Gloster. The name 'Gloster' was chosen in recognition of the local airport built in the style of an old English Aerodrome and the nearby Glostershire aviation subdivision.

The incorporation election was held on May 4, 2019. A total of 100 votes were cast with 86 residents voting in favor of incorporating Gloster as a Type C General-Law municipality and 14 opposed. Residents were also given the option of choosing a Mayor and two Commissioners in the event that incorporation measure passed. In the mayoral race, Laura Meyer defeated Brandon Hawbaker, 79 votes to 18. Four candidates competed in the Commissioners race. Henry Mlcak received 78 votes, followed by John Couch with 65, John Mathews with 27 and 25 for Michael Blommer. Mlcak and Couch were elected Commissioners. The election results were canvassed at the May 13, 2019 meeting of the Austin County Commissioners Court, formally creating the city of Gloster.

Residents returned to the polls on November 5, 2019, to vote on two propositions. Proposition A was the adoption of the adoption of a one percent local sales and use tax to fund city operations, which passed 56 votes to 28. Proposition B contained two parts. The first asked residents if they favored a change from the name of Gloster, with 64 voting in favor and 22 opposed. With the measure endorsed, the choices of  "Mistek" and "South Frydek" were presented as potential names for the city. South Frydek narrowly edged out Mistek, 37 to 33.

The Sealy Independent School District serves South Frydek.

References

Cities in Austin County, Texas
Cities in Texas
Greater Houston